Escotet is a surname. Notable people with the surname include:

Juan Carlos Escotet (born 1959), Spanish-Venezuelan billionaire banker
Miguel Angel Escotet, Spanish-American social scientist, education administrator, and author

See also
Escott (disambiguation)